Osmond Christmas Album is a holiday album by the Osmond family, released in 1976.  The album peaked at No. 127 on the U.S. Billboard Top LP's chart, a modest improvement from their previous two albums.

The original double album consisted of twenty Christmas songs (listed below) combining some original songs with traditional carols and secular Christmas standards, and included all seven performing members of the Osmond family, the first studio album to do so. Each track featured one of the various acts encompassed by the seven siblings: The Osmond Brothers, Donny Osmond, Marie Osmond, Donny & Marie as a duet, or Jimmy Osmond.

Later re-issues on compact disc were under the title Osmond Family Christmas and had eight of the original tracks removed, including all of Jimmy's solo performances.  Some of the re-issued tracks added Marie singing along with her brothers on tracks that she originally did not perform on.

Album Notes 
The track Sleigh Ride is a completely different song from the Leroy Anderson composition.
All of the Osmonds (the brothers with Marie and Jimmy) perform together only on the Pine Cones & Holly Berries/It's Beginning To Look A Lot Like Christmas medley.
Caroling Medley, an assortment of ten traditional Christmas carols, is performed by the Osmond Brothers a cappella.

Track listing (original 1976 release)

Track listing (1991 re-release)

References

1976 albums
1976 Christmas albums
Christmas albums by American artists
Polydor Records albums
The Osmonds albums
Albums produced by Don Costa
Pop Christmas albums